Kelly Liggan (born 5 February 1979) is a retired tennis player from Ireland.

Liggan resides in Marbella, Spain, but plays tennis for Ireland. She has had some success on the ITF Women's Circuit winning several titles in both singles and doubles, and in 2002 she won her sole WTA Tour doubles title.

Liggan had two Grand Slam doubles main-draw appearances. She reached the second round at the 2003 US Open and 2004 Wimbledon Championships. Liggan had several WTA Tour main-draw appearances; however, she never reached a quarterfinal.

Due to nagging injuries, Kelly retired in 2010.

WTA career finals

Doubles: 1 (title)

ITF Circuit finals

Singles (4–4)

Doubles (7–13)

External links

References

1979 births
Living people
Irish expatriate sportspeople in Spain
Irish female tennis players
Sportspeople from Málaga